The 1892 College Football All-America team was composed of college football players who were selected as the best players at their respective positions for the 1892 college football season, as selected by Caspar Whitney for Harper's Weekly and the Walter Camp Football Foundation. Whitney began publishing his All-America Team in 1889, and his list, which was considered the official All-America Team, was published in Harper's Weekly from 1891 to 1896. Harvard Law School student and football center William H. Lewis became the first African-American to be selected as an All-American in 1892, an honor he would receive again in 1893.

All-American selections for 1892

Key
 WC = Walter Camp
 CW = Caspar Whitney, published in Harper's Weekly magazine.
 Bold = Consensus All-American

Ends
 Frank Hinkey, Yale (College Football Hall of Fame) (WC, CW)
 Frank Hallowell, Harvard (WC, CW)

Tackles
 Alexander Hamilton Wallis, Yale (WC, CW)
 Marshall Newell, Harvard (College Football Hall of Fame) (WC, CW)

Guards

 Art Wheeler, Princeton (College Football Hall of Fame) (WC, CW)
 Bert Waters, Harvard (WC)

Centers
 William H. Lewis, Harvard (first African-American All-American) (WC, CW)

Quarterback
 Philip King, Princeton (College Football Hall of Fame) (WC, CW)

Halfbacks
 Vance McCormick, Yale (WC, CW)
 Harry Thayer, Penn (WC, CW)

Fullbacks
 Charley Brewer, Harvard (College Football Hall of Fame) (WC, CW)

References

All-America Team
College Football All-America Teams